"Time After Time" is a 1983 song by American singer-songwriter Cyndi Lauper, co-written with Rob Hyman, who also provided backing vocals. It was the second single released from her debut studio album, She's So Unusual (1983). The track was produced by Rick Chertoff and released as a single on January 27, 1984. The song became Lauper's first number 1 hit in the U.S. The song was written in the album's final stages, after "Girls Just Wanna Have Fun", "She Bop" and "All Through the Night" had been written. The writing began with the title, which Lauper had seen in TV Guide magazine, referring to the science fiction film Time After Time (1979).

Music critics gave the song positive reviews, with many commending the song for being a solid and memorable love song. The song has been selected as one of the Best Love Songs of All Time by many media outlets, including Rolling Stone, Nerve, MTV and many others. "Time After Time" was also nominated for a Grammy Award for Song of the Year at the 1985 edition. The song was a success on the charts, becoming her first number-one single on the US Billboard Hot 100 chart on June 9, 1984, and remaining there for two weeks. The song reached number three on the UK Singles Chart and number six on the ARIA Singles Chart.

Background and recording 

Although "Time After Time" would eventually become one of Lauper's signature songs, it was one of the last songs on her debut album to be recorded. While Lauper was still writing material for She's So Unusual in the spring of 1983, her producer, Rick Chertoff introduced her to American musician Rob Hyman, a founding member of the Hooters. Lauper had by then already recorded the majority of the album, including the songs "Girls Just Want to Have Fun" and "She Bop," but Chertoff insisted that she and Hyman needed to record just "one more song". Therefore, she and Hyman sat at a piano and started working on "Time After Time".

The inspiration for the song came from the fact that both songwriters were going through similar challenges in their respective romantic relationships; Hyman was coming out of a relationship, and Lauper was having difficulties with her boyfriend/manager, David Wolff. One of the early lines Rob wrote was "suitcase of memories," which according to Lauper, "struck her," claiming it was a "wonderful line," and other lines came from Lauper's life experiences. The song's title was borrowed from a TV Guide listing for the 1979 movie Time After Time, which Lauper had intended to use only as a temporary placeholder during the writing process. Although she later tried to change the song's name, she said that she felt at some point that "Time After Time" had become so fundamental to the song that it would fall apart with a different title.

Initially, Epic Records wanted "Time After Time" as the album's lead single. However, Lauper felt that releasing a ballad as her debut solo single would have pigeonholed her stylistically as a balladeer, limiting her future work and thus potentially killing her career. Wolff felt that "Girls Just Wanna Have Fun" could become a successful pop anthem and was a better choice; ultimately the label agreed and released it as the lead single. "Time After Time" became the album's second single, released on January 27, 1984.

Composition and lyrics 
Written by Cyndi Lauper and Rob Hyman and produced by Rick Chertoff, "Time After Time" is built over simple keyboard-synth chords, bright, jangly guitars, clock ticking percussion, and elastic bassline. Lyrically, the track is a love song of devotion. Pam Avoledo of Blogcritics speculates that, "In 'Time After Time,' Lauper believes she is a difficult person, unworthy of love. She runs away and shuts people out. However, her devoted boyfriend who loves her unconditionally is willing to help her through anything. The relationship is given depth. The couple’s intimacy and history is apparent. They've been together for a long time. They love and have seen each other through every tough part of their life."

"Time After Time" is written in the key of C major with a tempo of 130 beats per minute in common time.  Lauper's vocals span from G3 to C5 in the song.

Critical reception 
The song received critical acclaim: 
 Sal Cinquemani of Slant Magazine praised the track, calling it "the album's finest moment, if not Lauper's greatest moment period." 
 Susan Glen of PopMatters also called it a standout track, naming it "gorgeous".
 Bryan Lee Madden of Sputnikmusic simply called it "a masterpiece" and "the best and most significant song she ever wrote or recorded." 
 Brenon Veevers of Renowned for Sound labeled it "sentimental" and "gorgeous".
 Scott Floman, music critic for Goldmine magazine, described the song as "gorgeously heartfelt" and "one of the decade’s finest ballads". 
 Chris Gerard of Metro Weekly summarized the song as a "beautiful and bittersweet ballad."
 Cash Box said that the song "is a gentle, reflective tune that displays the deep resonance of Lauper's vocal talents."

Accolades 
"Time After Time" has entered many lists of "Best Love Songs of All Time", "Best Ballads from the 80s" and others. Bill Lamb, also from About.com, placed the song at number 21 on his "Top 100 Best Love Songs Of All Time" list. On Nerves list of "The 50 Greatest Love Songs of All Time", "Time After Time" was placed at number 5, being called "Lauper's most enduring masterpiece hits at the very essence of commitment," with the article pointing out that "she captures real romance in the most simple and straightforward of lines: 'If you're lost, you can look and you will find me, time after time'."

The song also entered the Rolling Stone & MTV's "100 Greatest Pop Songs" at number 66. The song also entered VH1's "100 Best Songs of the Past 25 Years and "100 Greatest Songs of the 80s" lists, at numbers 22 and 19 respectively. The song was also present on NME's 100 Best Songs of the 1980s, being ranked at number 79. The website declared that "‘Time After Time’ was a change in tack for Lauper, whose musical persona had previously been unstoppably light and frothy. ‘Time After Time’ was demoed quickly in time for inclusion on her debut ‘She’s So Unusual’, and ended up being a key song for both Lauper’s career and the decade itself."

The song was featured as an iconic scene in the 1997 film Romy and Michele's High School Reunion. According to director David Mirkin it "was the only song that had the proper emotion" to fit the scene.

Awards and nominations
Won
1984 – American Video Awards for Best Female Performance 
1984 – American Video Awards for Best Pop Video
1984 – BMI Awards for Pop Award
1984 – Billboard Awards for Best Female Performance
1985 – Pro Canada Awards for Most Performed Foreign Song
2008 – BMI Millionaire Award for 5 Million Spins on US Radio 
2009 – BMI Awards for Pop Award
Nominations
1984 – MTV Video Music Award for Best New Artist
1984 – MTV Video Music Award for Best Female Video
1984 – MTV Video Music Award for Best Direction
1985 – Grammy Award for Song of the Year

Lists of best songs

 Chart performance 
"Time After Time" became Lauper's first number-one single on the Billboard charts, reaching the top of the Billboard Hot 100 chart in June 1984. It also reached the top of the Adult Contemporary and Canadian Singles Chart. In Europe, the single peaked at number 2, on July 9, 1984. In the United Kingdom, "Time After Time" first peaked at number 54 on March 24, 1984, while peaking later at number 3, on July 14, 1984. In New Zealand, the song reached number 3, in Austria it reached number 5, in Switzerland it reached number 7, in France it peaked at number 9 and in Sweden it reached a peak of number 10.

Music video
 
The video for "Time After Time" was directed by Edd Griles (who had previously directed the music video for "Girls Just Want to Have Fun") and its storyline is about a young woman leaving her lover behind. Lauper's mother, brother, and then-boyfriend, David Wolff, appear in the video, and Lou Albano, who played her father in the "Girls Just Want to Have Fun" video, can be seen as a cook. Portions of the video were filmed at the now-demolished Tom's Diner in Roxbury Township, New Jersey, the intersection of Route 46 and Route 10 and at the Morristown train station. Portions of the video were also shot in front of Betty's Department Store in Wharton, New Jersey, which was a staple of the community in the 1970s. According to Lauper, "It was important to me that we were natural and human in the video. I wanted to convey somebody who walked her own path and did not always get along with everyone and did not always marry the guy." The video opens with Lauper watching the 1936 film The Garden of Allah and the final scene, where she gets on the train and waves goodbye to David, has Lauper crying for real.

Track listingEuropean 12" single"Time After Time" – 4:01 (Cyndi Lauper; Rob Hyman)
"I'll Kiss You" – 4:12 (Cyndi Lauper; Jules Shear)
"Girls Just Want to Have Fun" (extended version) – 6:08 (Robert Hazard)
"Girls Just Want to Have Fun" (instrumental) – 7:10 (Robert Hazard)US vinyl, 7" single 
"Time After Time"
"I'll Kiss You"

Personnel
 Written by Cyndi Lauper, Rob Hyman
 Produced by Rick Chertoff
 Executive producer: Lennie Petze
 Associate producer: William Wittman
 Engineered by William Wittman
 Arranged by Cyndi Lauper, Rick Chertoff, Rob Hyman, Eric Bazilian

 Musicians 
Cyndi Lauper – lead vocals, backing vocals
Rob Hyman – keyboards, backing vocals
Peter Wood – synthesizers
Eric Bazilian – electric guitar
Neil Jason – bass guitar
Anton Fig – drums

Charts

Weekly charts

Featuring Sarah McLachlan (2005)

US re-release (2014)

Year-end charts

US re-release

Certifications

INOJ version
American R&B singer INOJ recorded her version of the song in 1998. It peaked at number six on the U.S. Billboard Hot 100 chart. The music video of this version first aired on BET and The Box.

Weekly charts

Year-end charts

Certifications

Novaspace version
Novaspace, a German Eurodance project, covered the song on their album Supernova (2003). It reached number six in Germany, number seven in Austria, and number 15 in Australia.

 Track listing Australia / Europe / Spain / U.S. CD Single Time After Time [Radio Edit] – 3:43
 Time After Time [Time Mix] – 5:36
 Time After Time [After Time Mix] – 6:29
 Time After Time [Novaspace Mix] – 6:06
 Time After Time [Instrumental] – 6:06Sweden CD Single Time After Time [UK Radio Edit] – 3:18
 Time After Time [Time Mix] – 5:36
 Time After Time [After Time Mix] – 6:32
 Time After Time [Novaspace Mix] – 6:06
 Time After Time [Sol Productions Remix] – 6:14
 Time After Time [Pascal Remix] – 6:30UK CD Single Time After Time [Radio Edit] – 3:18
 Time After Time [Pascal Remix] – 6:32
 Time After Time [Time Mix] – 5:36UK 12" Vinyl'''
 Time After Time [Time Mix]
 Time After Time [I Nation Remix]
 Time After Time [Nick Skitz Remix]

 Weekly charts 

 Year-end charts 

Quietdrive version
American alternative rock/pop punk band Quietdrive covered the song for their debut album When All That's Left Is You in 2006. The cover version was featured in the 2006 romantic comedy film John Tucker Must Die starring Jesse Metcalfe and Brittany Snow. The cover is their only charting song, hitting number 25 on the Mainstream Top 40 Countdown. The cover was certified gold by the RIAA.

Weekly charts

Certifications

Other notable cover versions
Jazz trumpeter Miles Davis, perhaps the earliest artist to interpret the song, recorded an instrumental version of the song for his 1985 album You're Under Arrest. The song became a regular part of Davis's live concerts until the end of his career, such as on Live Around the World (a live compilation recorded 1988 to 1991, released 1996). Lauper later stated that while the song has been recorded by dozens of musicians, "The most honored I ever felt was when Miles Davis covered it", adding: "the way he played it was pure magic."

In 1993, Mark Williams and Tara Morice recorded a cover for the Strictly Ballroom soundtrack.

Lauper did a parody of the song on a 1995 episode of Late Show with David Letterman as "Lactose Intolerant".

American indie rock band Sarge recorded a cover of the song in 1997, which was included on a 7" single that year. In 2000, it appeared on their posthumous compilation album Distant. AllMusic's Mike DaRonco said that their version "outshines the original."

A UK garage version was released by Distant Soundz in 2002 and was a top 20 hit in the UK, peaking at No. 20 on the UK Singles Chart and No. 4 on the UK Dance Singles Chart.

On Billboard'' charts for the week ending May 14, 2011, Javier Colon's version peaked at number 65 on Hot 100, number 41 on Digital Song Sales number four on Top Heatseekers and number sixteen on R&B/Hip-Hop Digital Songs Sales.

A cover version by Mabel featured in the McDonald's Christmas commercial in the UK in 2021, and peaked at No. 71 on the UK chart.

See also
 List of RPM number-one singles of 1984
 List of Hot 100 number-one singles of 1984 (U.S.)
 List of number-one adult contemporary singles of 1984 (U.S.)
 List of Cash Box Top 100 number-one singles of 1984

References

Further reading

External links
  Video on VH1 Classic website
 
 "Time after Time" Songfacts

1983 songs
1984 singles
1980s ballads
Rock ballads
New wave ballads
Cyndi Lauper songs
Billboard Hot 100 number-one singles
Cashbox number-one singles
1998 singles
INOJ songs
2002 singles
Ronan Keating songs
Mark Williams (singer) songs
Number-one singles in Zimbabwe
RPM Top Singles number-one singles
Songs written by Cyndi Lauper
Songs written by Rob Hyman
The Hooters songs
Nana Mouskouri songs
Epic Records singles
Portrait Records singles
Song recordings produced by Rick Chertoff